Klagenfurt Cathedral is the cathedral of the Roman Catholic Diocese of Gurk-Klagenfurt and also the main parish church of Klagenfurt. It was built by Protestants and dedicated to the Holy Trinity in 1581, and was the largest Protestant church in Austria at that time.

History

Klagenfurt Cathedral was commissioned by Christoph Windisch, Klagenfurt' s first mayor.  In 1600, during the Counter-Reformation, it was given to the Jesuits and rededicated to Saints Peter and Paul. The church was razed to the ground by a fire and had to be rebuilt in 1724. Bishop Franz Xaver von Salm-Reifferscheid made it the cathedral of the Diocese of Gurk in 1787.

See also
 List of Jesuit sites

References

Roman Catholic cathedrals in Austria
Klagenfurt
Buildings and structures in Carinthia (state)
Baroque church buildings in Austria